Clarence Carson Parks II (26 April 1936 – 22 June 2005), also known as C. Carson Parks, was an American songwriter, music publisher, musician and singer, best known for writing the hit song "Somethin' Stupid". His younger brother is the composer Van Dyke Parks.

Early life and career
Parks was born in Philadelphia, the son of a psychiatrist. Carson's early musical training began as a student at the internationally acclaimed American Boychoir School (formerly known as The Columbus Boychoir School). After attending Phillips Academy in Andover, Massachusetts, the University of Miami and then Carnegie Mellon University, he began working in Los Angeles. In 1959, with college friend Bernie Armstrong, he formed the Steeltown Two and first recorded for the small Gini label. The duo also worked as one half of a reformed version of Terry Gilkyson's band, The Easy Riders, and in 1960 they performed on the soundtrack of the John Wayne film The Alamo.  The pair also worked as The Kinsmen with singer Bud Dashiell, before Parks left in 1962.  He then formed a new version of the Steeltown Two, with his younger brother, Van Dyke Parks, occasionally adding singer Pat Peyton as the Steeltown Three and the Southcoasters.

Following the success of The New Christy Minstrels, Gilkyson and the Parks brothers then formed a choral group, The Greenwood County Singers, featuring five men and two women.  They released four albums on Kapp Records between 1963 and 1965, later becoming known as The Greenwood Singers and finally The Greenwoods. The group had two minor hits, "Please Don't Sell My Daddy No More Wine" reaching #64 on the Billboard Hot 100 in 1966, and included singer Gaile Foote, whom Carson Parks married.

"Somethin' Stupid"
Before the Greenwoods disbanded, Parks and Foote also began performing as a duo, Carson and Gaile, and in 1966 recorded an album for Kapp Records, San Antonio Rose. This mostly included Parks' own songs, one of which was the track "Somethin' Stupid". Through a contact in Frank Sinatra's organisation, Parks ensured that Sinatra heard the song. Sinatra played it to his daughter Nancy's producer, Lee Hazlewood, who recalled "He asked me, 'Do you like it?' and I said, 'I love it, and if you don't sing it with Nancy, I will.' He said, 'We're gonna do it, book a studio.'" The recording by Frank and Nancy Sinatra spent four weeks at #1 on the US Billboard Hot 100 chart and reached #1 on the UK Singles Chart.

Later career
Following the success of "Somethin' Stupid", Parks wrote songs for other artists, including The Mills Brothers and Jack Jones. The Mills Brothers recording of Parks' "Cab Driver" reached #23 on the Billboard Hot 100 and #3 on the Billboard Easy listening chart in 1968. He receded from performing and writing to focus on publishing, owning and operating the Waynesville, North Carolina-based music publishing firms Greenwood Music and Br'er Rab Music. He died in 2005 in St. Marys, Georgia.

Discography

The Steeltown Two
45  1959  The Wolves / Tarrytown (Gini Records)
45  1959  The Potters Wheel / The Straw Carol (Neophon Records)

The Easy Riders
LP  1960  Rollin' (Kapp Records)
LP  1961  Remember the Alamo  (Kapp Records)
LP  1963  The Cry of the Wild Goose  (Kapp Records)
45  1961? Deep Blue Sea / Nite Life  (Montclare Records)

Bud Dashiell and the Kinsmen
LP  1961  Bud Dashiell and the Kinsmen  (Warner Bros. Records)

The Steeltown Three
45  1962? Rock Mountain / The Girl with the Sad Eyes (Montclare Records)

The Southcoasters
45  1962? San Francisco Bay / Long Gone from the Farm  (Montclare Records)

The Greenwood County Singers
LP  1964  The First Recording by the Joyful...  (Kapp Records)
45  1964  Frankie and Johnny (aka The New Frankie and Johnnie Song) / Climb Up Sunshine Mountain   (Kapp # 591) (Billboard # 75 pop)
LP  1964  Have You Heard...  (Kapp Records)
LP  1965  The Ballad of Cat Ballou  (Kapp Records)
45  1965  Anne / Cake Walking Babies from Home  (Kapp Records)

The Greenwoods
45  1966  Please Don't Sell My Daddy No More Wine / Southbound (Kapp # 742) (Billboard # 64 pop)

Carson and Gaile
LP  1966  San Antonio Rose  (Kapp Records)
45  1966  The Wild Side of Life / How Much Is That Doggie... (Congress Records)
45  1967  Something Stupid / Chapter One  (Kapp Records)

References

External links

1936 births
2005 deaths
Songwriters from Pennsylvania
20th-century American musicians